

Mitchellville is a locality in the Australian state of South Australia located on the east coast of Eyre Peninsula about  north-west of the state capital of Adelaide and about  north of the municipal seat of Cowell.

Its boundaries were created in 1998 in respect to the “low established name” which is derived from John Mitchell which was an "early settler" in the area.

Land use in Mitchellville is divided between primary industry and conservation with the former being represented by “broadacre farming of cereals and livestock” and the latter being represented by the zoning of the land adjoining the coastline with Spencer Gulf.

Mitchellville is located within the federal division of Grey, the state electoral district of Flinders and the local government area of the District Council of Franklin Harbour.

References

Towns in South Australia
Eyre Peninsula
Spencer Gulf